Narciso Serradell Sevilla (1843–1910, born in Alvarado, Veracruz) was a physician, composer, and author of the song La golondrina. After theological college he'd studied medicine and music.

During the French intervention in Mexico he was captured and exiled to France, where he devoted himself to teaching music and Spanish. Before the deportation he'd composed his most famous work, La golondrina ("The swallow"), which became the signature song of the Mexican exiles.

After returning to Mexico he practiced his medical profession while still composing music and directing military bands. He died in Mexico City at the age of 67 years.

References

External links
 

1843 births
1910 deaths
Mexican expatriates in France